= Chadwa =

Muslim community in India

The Chadwa are a Muslim community found in the states of Rajasthan (known as Chudrigaran) and Gujarat in India.
